Baqerabad-e Kord (also Romanized as Bāqerābād-e Kord; also known as Bāqerābād) is a village in Basharyat-e Sharqi Rural District, Basharyat District, Abyek County, Qazvin Province, Iran. At the 2006 census, its population was 439, in 107 families.

References 

Populated places in Abyek County